High in the Clouds is a children's adventure novel written by musician/songwriter Paul McCartney and Philip Ardagh, illustrated by Geoff Dunbar, and published by Faber and Faber in October 2005. As writer/producer and animator/director, McCartney and Dunbar had collaborated on the 1984 animated film Rupert and the Frog Song, and High in the Clouds was scripted and sketched for several years by the two of them as another film.

Synopsis
When the characters' home, Woodland, is attacked by human development, a young squirrel (Wirral) is left without a home and without his mother. Guided by his mother's final words and aided by his fellow animal friends he meets on his journey, Wirral goes on a quest for the secret island sanctuary of Animalia. Wirral finds himself in an epic journey filled with evil realities and wild dreams. He and his friends experience tragedy, war, joy and victory, all in the name of freedom and peace.

Reception
The book has an overall theme of preserving nature and letting animals live free and in their natural habitat. In The Observer it was described as "a tale about the perils of unchecked global capitalism".

Film adaptation
In 2013, it was reported that an animated feature film adaptation of the book was in development by producers Michael Lynne and Bob Shaye through their Unique Features banner and RGH Entertainment. Tony Bancroft was set to direct the film, written by Josh Klausner, and was originally going to have a theatrical release in 2015. The film was optioned by Gaumont. In 2019, it was announced Netflix had partnered up with Gaumont to co-produce. Jon Croker has written the script and Timothy Reckart will replace Bancroft as director while former Beatle singer and author Paul McCartney serves as executive producer and songwriter, of which he composed original songs and score for the film. The film is set for a 2023 release.

References

External links 
 "Paul McCartney: A collaborative crusade", The Independent, 11 November 2005

2005 British novels
British children's novels
Paul McCartney
Faber and Faber books
Fictional squirrels
Children's books adapted into films
Children's novels about animals
2005 children's books
Books adapted into films